"Twerk" is a song by American hip hop duo City Girls featuring American rapper Cardi B, from the duo's debut album Girl Code (2018). It was released to US rhythmic contemporary radio on January 8, 2019, as the album's lead single. Filmed in Miami, the song's music video was released the same month. "Twerk" is a New Orleans bounce-inspired song, which heavily samples Choppa's "Choppa Style". It also samples the popular Triggerman beat, which is prominent among the New Orleans bounce scene. It peaked at number 29 on the US Billboard Hot 100 chart and was certified Platinum by the Recording Industry Association of America (RIAA).

Production
"Twerk" employs a xylophone sounding melody, hand claps and "feverish" snares. In her verse, Cardi references Jermaine Dupri's "Money Ain't a Thang".

Music video
Directed by Daps and Sara Lacombe, the music video was filmed in Miami, Florida in December 2018 and released on January 16, 2019. The video shows Cardi B and Yung Miami painted like a tiger and zebra, respectively, partying with a number of women on a yacht. In another location, at a construction site, they are joined by the top 20 finalists of the challenge sent by the City Girls, which consisted on finding "the world's greatest twerker." The clip closes with the winner of the challenge.

Reception
In Billboard Carl Lamarre opined, "the titillating video reaches its climax when the women hit the dirt and break into some next-level twerking. The mesermizing display will certainly drop some jaws, as both Cardi and Yung Miami redefine the meaning of twerk with their fun-filled visual." Complexs Sarah Montgomery stated "this isn't your typical bad b*tches twerking to a banger music video." Meanwhile Entertainment Weeklys Shirley Li described the clip as "incredible and hypnotic and very, very cheeky, in all senses of the word."

Conservative columnist Stephanie Hamill from right-wing news website The Daily Caller criticized the video, tweeting, "in the era of #MeToo how exactly does this empower women?". Cardi B responded, "it says to women that I can wear and not wear whatever I want, do [whatever] I want and that no still means no," and questioned Hamill for misleading the purpose of the movement.

Awards and nominations

Charts

Weekly charts

Year-end charts

Certifications

Release history

References

External links

2018 songs
2019 singles
City Girls songs
Cardi B songs
Capitol Records singles
Motown singles
Songs written by Cardi B
Songs written by Rico Love
Miami bass songs
Songs about dancing